The Cheyenne County Courthouse in Cheyenne Wells, Colorado is a Georgian Revival-style building that was built in 1908 and first used in 1909.  It was listed on the National Register of Historic Places (NRHP) in 1989.

It was deemed significant for its association with the rapid homesteading of Cheyenne County which was created just 20 years before the courthouse was built, and for its architecture.  It was designed by noted Colorado architect John J. Huddart.

It was renovated and extended to the back in 1983.

See also
Cheyenne County Jail, also NRHP-listed and located in Cheyenne Wells

References

Courthouses on the National Register of Historic Places in Colorado
County courthouses in Colorado
Government buildings completed in 1908
Colonial Revival architecture in Colorado
Buildings and structures in Cheyenne County, Colorado
National Register of Historic Places in Cheyenne County, Colorado
1908 establishments in Colorado